La Ferté is a French toponym meaning a fortress or bastion, derived from Gallo-Roman firmitate, ultimately from Latin firmus, meaning 'stable or strong.' It is the name or part of the name of several communes in France:

 La Ferté, Jura, in the Jura département
 La Ferté-Alais, in the Essonne département  
 La Ferté-Beauharnais, in the Loir-et-Cher département 
 La Ferté-Bernard, in the Sarthe département 
 La Ferté-Chevresis, in the Aisne département  
 La Ferté-Frênel, in the Orne département  
 La Ferté-Gaucher, in the Seine-et-Marne département 
 La Ferté-Hauterive, in the Allier département  
 La Ferté-Imbault, in the Loir-et-Cher département 
 La Ferté-Loupière, in the Yonne département 
 La Ferté-Macé, in the Orne département 
 La Ferté-Milon, in the Aisne département
 La Ferté-Saint-Aubin, in the Loiret département 
 La Ferté-Saint-Cyr, in the Loir-et-Cher département  
 La Ferté-Saint-Samson, in the Seine-Maritime département 
 La Ferté-sous-Jouarre, in the Seine-et-Marne département 
 La Ferté-sur-Chiers, in the Ardennes département 
 La Ferté-Vidame, in the Eure-et-Loir département 
 La Ferté-Villeneuil, in the Eure-et-Loir département  
 Ville-sous-la-Ferté, in the Aube département 
 La Ferté Abbey, a Cistercian abbey in La-Ferté-sur-Grosne in the commune of Saint-Ambreuil, Saône-et-Loire département

See also
 Laferté-sur-Amance, in the Haute-Marne département  
 Laferté-sur-Aube, in the Haute-Marne département